In spinning, a lazy kate (also simply known as a kate) is a device used to hold one or more spools or bobbins in place while the yarn on them is wound off from the side of the bobbin. Typically, a kate consists of multiple rods, which allow the bobbins to spin. Tensioned kates have a band that loops over the bobbins to prevent them from spinning freely. Some spinning wheels have built-in kates, although these tend to be more cumbersome to use than free-standing ones. 

Kates are commonly used to ply yarn but may be used for any task which involves winding off yarn from a bobbin. 

While a wooden kate such as the one pictured is much sturdier, the same effect can be achieved with a cardboard box and some sort of dowels.

References

Resources
Detailed instructions on making your own kate using easily found materials.

Spinning
Knitting tools and materials